The East Dubuque station of East Dubuque, Illinois originally served the Illinois Central Railroad and Chicago, Burlington and Quincy Railroad. Passenger service ceased upon the formation of Amtrak in 1971, but resumed between Chicago and Dubuque in 1974 under the name Black Hawk. Service ceased on September 30, 1981. The depot no longer exists.

Bibliography

References

External links
East Dubuque, Illinois– TrainWeb

Former Amtrak stations in Illinois
Former Illinois Central Railroad stations
Former Chicago, Burlington and Quincy Railroad stations
Former Chicago Great Western Railway stations
1855 establishments in Illinois
Railway stations closed in 1971
Railway stations in the United States opened in 1855
Railway stations closed in 1981